The 2021 Campeonato Brasileiro Série B was a football competition held in Brazil, equivalent to the second division. The competition began on 28 May and ended on 28 November.

Twenty teams competed in the tournament, twelve returning from the 2020 season, four promoted from the 2020 Campeonato Brasileiro Série C (Brusque, Londrina, Remo and Vila Nova), and four relegated from the 2020 Campeonato Brasileiro Série A (Botafogo, Coritiba, Goiás and Vasco da Gama).

Brusque were deducted three points after they were punished by Superior Tribunal de Justiça Desportiva (STJD) for racial abuse aimed toward Londrina's player Celsinho during the match Brusque v Londrina, played on 28 August (21st round). Brusque also were sanctioned with a fine of R$60,000. On 18 November 2021, STJD overturned its decision and the three points were returned to Brusque.

The top four teams were promoted to the 2022 Campeonato Brasileiro Série A. Botafogo and Coritiba became the first two clubs to be promoted on 15 November 2021 after a 2–1 win against Operário Ferroviário and a 1–0 Brusque win against CRB, respectively. Goiás were promoted on 22 November 2021 and Avaí on 28 November 2021.

Teams

Number of teams by state

Venues

Personnel and kits

Managerial changes

Notes

Foreign players
The clubs could have a maximum of five foreign players in their Campeonato Brasileiro squads per match, but there was no limit of foreigners in the clubs' squads.

(dn) = Player holding Brazilian dual nationality.

League table

Positions by round
The table lists the positions of teams after each week of matches. In order to preserve chronological evolvements, any postponed matches were not included to the round at which they were originally scheduled, but added to the full round they were played immediately afterwards.

Results

Top goalscorers

Awards

References

Campeonato Brasileiro Série B seasons
2